The 1988 Eckerd Open was a women's tennis tournament played on outdoor clay courts in Tampa, Florida in the United States and was part of the Category 3 tier of the 1988 WTA Tour. The tournament ran from March 28 through April 3, 1988. First-seeded Chris Evert won the singles title.

Finals

Singles

 Chris Evert defeated  Arantxa Sánchez 7–6(7–3), 6–4
 It was Evert's 1st singles title of the year and the 154th of her career.

Doubles

 Terry Phelps /  Raffaella Reggi defeated  Cammy MacGregor /  Cynthia MacGregor 6–2, 6–4
 It was Phelps' only title of the year and the 1st of her career. It was Reggi's only title of the year and the 6th of her career.

References

External links
 ITF tournament edition details
 Tournament draws

Eckerd Open
Eckerd Open
Eckerd Open
20th century in Tampa, Florida
Sports competitions in Tampa, Florida
Eckerd Open
Eckerd Open
Eckerd Open